The Fonda, Johnstown and Gloversville Railroad (FJ&G) was formerly a 132-mile steam engine and electric interurban railroad that connected its namesake towns in east central New York State to Schenectady, New York. It had a successful and profitable transportation business from 1870 until the 1980s carrying workers, salesmen, and executives of the very large number of glove manufacturing companies in the area to the New York Central (NYC) station at Schenectady. From here they could catch trains south to New York City (NYC) or west to Chicago. It also handled freight and had freight interchange with both the New York Central and the Delaware and Hudson railroads. Passenger business declined starting before the Great Depression and particularly during it. Following a determined and expensive effort to recapture passenger business by acquiring five ultra modern high-speed Brill Bullet interurban cars in 1932, the FJ&G abandoned passenger service in 1938. Freight business continued on for a few more decades, was later taken over by the Delaware and Otsego Railroad management and then eventually abandoned.

History and route

The FJ&G was formed in 1867 as a steam railroad. The first train ran from Fonda in 1870 all the way to Gloversville. Gloversville, named after the many glove companies in the area (237 in 1905), was at the northern end of the FJ&G for a few years before the railroad was pushed north by business owners. The Gloversville and Northville Railroad went from northern Gloversville through Mayfield and Cranberry Creek to Northville which became its permanent terminus. In the later 19th century Broadalbin made a connection with the FJ&G at Broadalbin Junction where trains could head east to Vail Mills and Broadalbin. The Gloversville and Broadalbin as well as the Gloversville and Northville railroads were eventually acquired by the Fonda Johnstown and Gloversville. The Fonda Johnstown and Gloversville was itself acquired by the Cayadutta Electric Railroad and both of these lines assumed the name of the FJ&G for the remainder of their lives. Across the Sacandaga River from Northville was the village of Sacandaga Park, which had become a favorite place for vacationers. The area offered a variety of accommodations, including the then-elegant Adirondack Inn, cabins and tent sites. There were beaches on the nearby Sacandaga River, and numerous amusements and rides, including a miniature train ride. Numerous FJ&G passengers detrained at Northville and continued on by horsedrawn hack or stage to Adirondack destinations to the north, including Wells, Lake Pleasant and Piseco. It was truly the "Gateway to the Adirondacks." By 1930, the State of New York had completed construction of a dam in the Sacandaga River at Conklingville, "to regulate the waters of the river", creating the Great Sacandaga Lake. The regulation was said to be needed to aid the water volume of the Hudson River to help ocean-going freighters use the Port of Albany. This flooded a large area, displacing many residents and covering many of the tracks of the FJ&G RR. A priceless photo of the era shows engine number 8 pulling a work crew, riding on top of the rising water as it covered the rails, on the last train out of Cranberry Creek. After the cutoff of the rail lines to Northville, (there were paved roads and many automobiles by that point), the bulk of the FJ&G's passenger service was solely by trolley on the interurban lines connecting with Fonda, Amsterdam and Schenectady.

Bullet cars

After World War I, ridership started to decline in both the steam and electric divisions. The steam line acquired gas-powered cars to take patrons to the Sacandaga Park in the early 1920s and FJ&G management concluded by 1932 that reequipping the passenger car fleet on the electric line would reverse matters even though the Depression had been underway since 1930. In 1932 at considerable expense, five lightweight, fast, comfortable, and power-efficient Brill Bullet interurban cars were purchased from J. G. Brill and Company of Philadelphia. The bright orange FJ&G interurbans ran hourly into Schenectady where they looped around Crescent Park. Ridership did initially improve with the operation of the new Bullet cars, but increased auto ownership, improved paved roads, the deepening of the Depression, and a further decline in the glove business brought on another ridership reversal. The first sale of the unique Bullet cars by Brill had been to the Philadelphia and Western Railroad. The second and last sale was to the FJ&G. One of the FJ&G's five Bullet cars has made its way (via Salt Lake City's Bamberger Railway) to the Orange Empire Railway Museum in Perris, California, where it is being restored. It still has its bright orange FJ&G paint. As late as the 1950s, FJ&G RR still made a daily passenger run to the village of Broadalbin, a single wood-clad 1880s vintage coach—usually with zero to two passengers—pushed or dragged by a Diesel switching locomotive. It was said that this was done to maintain the railroad's charter.

Passenger service abandonment

The Great Depression deepened and glove and fine leather manufacturing in Gloversville and Johnstown declined. The FJ&G's Mohawk River bridge had been damaged ten years earlier by river ice and was finally condemned by New York State in 1935 as too dangerous for any public transport. It had carried pedestrians and cars as well as the FJ&G trolleys. The interurban cars now no longer ran into Schenectady and looped to reverse direction at Crescent Park. The FJ&G was forced to go back to using older interurbans that could reverse operating direction without having to turn around. In 1938, the FJ&G decided to abandon the entire electric car service and shut the line down. The  Bullet cars eventually went to the Bamberger Railroad interurban in Utah. What had once been a 45-minute trolley ride from Schenectady to Gloversville now took 90 minutes or longer by motorbus.

Decline

As the next few decades passed following the abandonment of passenger service, freight business continued. With the collapse of the leather business and other industry leaving, traffic declined to the point of the FJ&G closing down after 104 years of private ownership in January 1974. The Delaware Otsego Corporation acquired the line in 1974, but after only a decade of ownership the Delaware Otsego System abandoned the line in 1984. A trackmobile formed one last train that traveled the line collecting any equipment left on the dormant line in 1988, and the tracks were removed 2 years later. Some of the right of way was turned into a recreational trail from just south of the city of Johnstown to Denny's Crossing near Broadalbin Junction. Another small portion near Vail Mills has also been converted to trail use, but the remainder of the original and now trackless FJ&G has remained unchanged for over 2 decades due to lack of funding, land disputes, and lack of interest. A small portion of the roadbed south of the city of Johnstown was built on by the Wal-Mart Distribution Center and the right of way in Vail Mills near routes 30 and 29 is soon to be altered with the intersection being converted to a traffic circle.

If the rails to trails is to continue the FJ&G will need to be paved from Denny's Crossing toward Vail Mills to form a connection in that area and onward into Broadalbin. On the southern portion, the original right of way will need to be altered to go around the industrial park to continue south toward Fonda.

Notes

References
 Middleton, Wm. D. The Interurban Era, 432pp. Kalmbach Publishing, Milwaukee, WI,  1961, reissue 2000. (. )
 Hilton, George, and Due, John. The Electric Interurban Railways in America, 408 pp, Stanford University Press, Pala Alto, CA. 1962, reissue 2008.
 Swett, Ira. Interurbans of Utah, Special #4, Interurbans Press, Glendale, CA. 1944.
 History of Jewett, Cincinnati Car Company, Wason, and J G Brill Company (Brill constructed the Bullet cars for FJ&G.) (add publisher information)
 CERA: Bulletin #127. From Bullets to BART, 132pp. Central Electric Railfans Association, Chicago, Il. 1989.
 Decker, Randy. The Fonda, Johnstown, and Gloversville: The Sacandaga Route to the Adirondacks 128pp. Arcadia Publishing, 2002.
 Larner, Paul. Our Railroad: History of the Fonda, Johnstown, and Gloversville Railroad, St. Albans, VT.
 Russel, Harold W., "The Fonda , Johnstown & Gloversville RR.", Model Railroader, August 1979, p. 58 - 75

External links
 Gino's Fonda Johnstown and Gloversville Railroad Page - many photographs of the FJ&GRR including its unique 1932 interurban Bullet cars built by J G Brill.

Defunct New York (state) railroads
Former Class I railroads in the United States
Interurban railways in New York (state)